The Tomé Tragedy was the worst fans bus disaster in the history of Chilean football. The tragedy affected the O'Higgins fans after a 2013 Torneo Transición match versus Huachipato in Talcahuano, where in the Cuesta Caracol, the bus fell into a ravine about 100 meters. A bus of the public transport of Rancagua Trans O'Higgins was the vehicle that suffered the accident.

It happened on Saturday February 9, 2013, leaving as a result, 16 deaths and 21 injuries. The disaster affected to the barra brava of the club, Trinchera Celeste.

The event marked the Chilean football, the city of Rancagua and Tomé, so that a date of mourning decreed in the different leagues of the ANFP, and a days in Rancagua and Tomé.

History

O'Higgins played by the 2013 Torneo Transición versus Huachipato in the Estadio CAP, match that ended with victory of Capo 2:0 with goals from Gonzalo Barriga and Juan Rodrigo Rojas.

After the match, a bus of fans was moving towards Dichato but I took in the Cuesta Caracol, the bus off a cliff 100 meters. Once it was known that the bus of fans mourning was declared in the cities of Rancagua and Tomé, as in the local tournament. The remains of the 16 dead were received by the fans in caravans and residents of Rancagua; and the remains were laid to rest in the Estadio El Teniente, where thousands of people attended.

Ten months after the accident, the club inaugurated a memorial located in the Monasterio Celeste, and one year of the event a memorial located near the Estadio El Teniente was inaugurated.

In the new Estadio El Teniente, 16 seats were placed in memory of those killed in the accident, located in Angostura, where is the Trinchera Celeste.

The match

List of deaths

The list of deaths was confirmed on February 10, 2013. Finally, 16 people died in the accident, but known at the time of the accident figures were much higher or lower figure was corrected when the rescue operation had ended knew.

Felipe Ignacio Bañado Hernández (17 years)
Sergio Andrés Ríos Rojas (28 years)
Tomás Andrés Loch Albornoz (18 years)
Nicolás Eduardo Osorio Montre (21 years)
Joaquín Sebastián Ávila Muñoz (16 years)
Arleth Belén Candia Morales (25 years)
Matías Alejandro Droguett Carrasco (16 years)
Rodrigo Felipe Valdés Aliaga (15 years)
Ignacio Antonio Jerez Rojas (17 years)
Alex Ramiro Carrasco Hoffmeister (24 years)
Hugo Bernardo Contreras Becerra (bus driver, 38 years)
Andrés Nicolás Osorio Cantillana (15 years)
Diego Esteban Sánchez Faúndez (18 years)
Luis Alberto Contreras Aedo (15 years)
Gonzalo Enrique Pavez Osorio (17 years)
Tomás Benjamín Contreras Román (1 year)

List of survivors

The list of survivors was confirmed on February 10, 2013.

Andrés Contreras Román
Aracely Román Garrido
Byron Castillo Orellana
Carlos Godoy Escobar
Cristian Alcayaga
César Muñoz
Danilo González Pizarro
Guillermo Fernández Arévalo
Jonathan Cornejo Becerra
Leandro Lira
Sebastián Ortega Moreno
Sebastián Troncoso Cortés
Simón Orellana Castillo
Paulina Silva Campos
Ramón Osorio
Sebastián Osorio
José González Covarrubias
Sebastián Cofré Valdivia
Felipe Ríos Rojas
Nicolás González Covarrubias
Nicolás Hidalgo

Condolences

References

O'Higgins F.C.
Rancagua
2013 in Chile
Road incidents in Chile
2013 road incidents